Jesper Dahl (born 13 June 1973), better known by the stage name Jokeren (The Joker), is a Danish hip-hop artist and rapper.

Dahl was born in Hillerød. In addition to his own recordings, he has been a prolific producer and has worked on American hip-hop albums, including one of Ice Cube's, alongside Danish productions. In 2006 he played the role of a mad drug dealer in Hella Joof's film Fidibus.

Jesper Dahl appears as one of the three judges in the Television Show Talent 09, a Danish adaptation of Britain's Got Talent.

Discography

Solo albums

Singles

Other singles
2003: "Havnen"
2003: "Kvinde din"
2003: "Sulten"
2005: "Godt taget"
2005: "Gravøl"
2005: "Rastløs"
2005: "Mænds ruin"
2008: "Yæssør"
2014: "Mit liv som hobo (så'n nogen som os)"

References

External links
 Official website
 
 

1973 births
Danish rappers
Living people
Danish people of Faroese descent
People from Hillerød Municipality